Sarah Feng (born September 2, 1999) is an American pair skater. With her former skating partner, TJ Nyman, she is the 2018 JGP Czech Republic bronze medalist and the 2018 U.S. national junior silver medalist. The pair placed within the top five at the 2019 World Junior Championships.

Personal life 
Feng was born on September 2, 1999, in Los Angeles, California to Lisa and GJ Feng. She has an older sister named Helen and a younger sister named Natalie. Feng is currently a student at Colorado Early Colleges Colorado Springs.

Career

Early career 
Feng previously competed with Anthony Ponomarenko in ice dance from 2010 to 2014. The two won the bronze medal in novice ice dancing at the 2014 U.S. Championships. They split so that Feng could focus on her singles career.

2016–2017 season 
Feng teamed up with TJ Nyman to compete in pairs in April 2017. The two were introduced by their coach, Dalilah Sappenfield.

2017–2018 season 
Feng/Nyman received their first Junior Grand Prix assignment in the 2017–18 season. They placed 8th at 2018 JGP Croatia.

Feng/Nyman won gold at 2017–18 Pacific Sectionals to qualify for Nationals in their first season together. They won silver at 2018 U.S. Nationals in junior pairs after skating together for less than a year. As a result, they were named to the U.S. team for the 2018 World Junior Figure Skating Championships in Sofia, Bulgaria, along with winners Audrey Lu / Misha Mitrofanov. Feng/Nyman finished eighth at the competition. Combined with Lu/Mitrofanov's fifth-place finish, they earned three spots for U.S. pairs at the 2019 World Junior Figure Skating Championships for the first time since 2016.

2018–2019 season 
Feng/Nyman opened their season at 2018 JGP Canada, where they finished sixth. They won their first international medal, a bronze, at 2018 JGP Czech Republic. Their results earned them a berth to the 2018–19 Junior Grand Prix Final in December in Vancouver, Canada. At the Junior Grand Prix Final, they withdrew after the short program due to Feng's injury. Despite withdrawing from 2019 U.S. Nationals, Feng/Nyman were named to the team for the 2019 World Junior Figure Skating Championships, where they placed fifth. Their placement, combined with teammates Laiken Lockley / Keenan Prochnow's sixth-place finish, retained three spots for U.S. pairs.

2019–2020 season 
Feng/Nyman began their season at Skate Detroit but on August 23, Nyman announced the end of their partnership.

Programs

With Nyman

Competitive highlights 
JGP: Junior Grand Prix

Pairs with Nyman

Ice dancing with Ponomarenko

Ladies' singles

References

External links 
 

1999 births
Living people
American female pair skaters
Figure skaters from Los Angeles
21st-century American women
20th-century American women